Zhang Ying Bin is a paralympic athlete from China competing mainly in category F55 javelin events.

Zhang Ying Bin competed in the 2004 Summer Paralympics in Athens, Greece winning the bronze medal in the combined F55-56 class javelin.

In the 2008 Summer Paralympics in Beijing, China, he won a silver medal in the men's F55-56 javelin throw event.

References

External links
 

Paralympic athletes of China
Athletes (track and field) at the 2004 Summer Paralympics
Paralympic bronze medalists for China
Chinese male javelin throwers
Living people
Medalists at the 2004 Summer Paralympics
Medalists at the 2008 Summer Paralympics
Paralympic silver medalists for China
Year of birth missing (living people)
Paralympic medalists in athletics (track and field)
21st-century Chinese people